The Magdalenian cultures (also Madelenian; French: Magdalénien) are later cultures of the Upper Paleolithic and Mesolithic in western Europe. They date from around 17,000 to 12,000 years ago. It is named after the type site of La Madeleine, a rock shelter located in the Vézère valley, commune of Tursac, in France's Dordogne department.

Édouard Lartet and Henry Christy originally termed the period L'âge du renne (the Age of the Reindeer). They conducted the first systematic excavations of the type site, publishing in 1875. The Magdalenian epoch is associated with reindeer hunters, although Magdalenian sites contain extensive evidence for the hunting of red deer, horses, and other large mammals present in Europe toward the end of the last glacial period. The culture was geographically widespread, and later Magdalenian sites stretched from Portugal in the west to Poland in the east, and as far north as France, the Channel Islands, England, and Wales. It is the third epoch of  Gabriel de Mortillet's cave chronology system, corresponding roughly to the Late Pleistocene.
Besides La Madeleine, the chief stations of the epoch are Les Eyzies, Laugerie-Basse, and Gorges d'Enfer in the Dordogne; Grotte du Placard in Charente and others in south-west France.

Period biology

The Magdalenian epoch is represented by numerous sites, whose contents show progress in arts and culture. It was characterized by a cold and dry climate, humans in association with the reindeer, and the extinction of the mammoth. The use of bone and ivory as implements, begun in the preceding Solutrean epoch, increased, making the period essentially a bone period. Bone instruments are quite varied: spear-points, harpoon-heads, borers, hooks and needles.

The fauna of the Magdalenian epoch seems to have included tigers and other tropical species along with reindeer, arctic foxes, arctic hares, and other polar creatures. Magdalenian humans appear to have been of short stature, dolichocephalic, with a low retreating forehead and prominent brow ridges.

Chronology

The culture spans from approximately 17,000 to 12,000 BP, toward the end of the most recent ice age. Magdalenian tool culture is characterised by regular blade industries struck from carinated cores.

The Magdalenian epoch is divided into six phases generally agreed to have chronological significance (Magdalenian I through VI, I being the earliest and VI being the latest). The earliest phases are recognised by the varying proportion of blades and specific varieties of scrapers, the middle phases marked by the emergence of a microlithic component (particularly the distinctive denticulated microliths), and the later phases by the presence of uniserial (phase5) and biserial 'harpoons' (phase6) made of bone, antler and ivory.

Debate continues about the nature of the earliest Magdalenian assemblages, and it remains questionable whether the Badegoulian culture is the earliest phase of Magdalenian culture. Similarly, finds from the forest of Beauregard near Paris have been suggested as belonging to the earliest Magdalenian. The earliest Magdalenian sites are in France. The Epigravettian is a similar culture appearing at the same time. Its known range extends from southeast France to the western shores of the Volga River, Russia, with many sites in Italy.

The later phases of Magdalenian culture are contemporaneous with the human re-settlement of north-western Europe after the Last Glacial Maximum during the Late Glacial Maximum. As hunter gatherers, Magdalenians did not re-settle permanently in northwest Europe, instead following herds and seasons.

By the end of the Magdalenian epoch, lithic technology shows a pronounced trend toward increased microlithisation. The bone harpoons and points have the most distinctive chronological markers within the typological sequence. As well as flint tools, Magdalenians are known for their elaborate worked bone, antler and ivory that served both functional and aesthetic purposes, including perforated batons.

The sea shells and fossils found in Magdalenian sites may be sourced to relatively precise areas and have been used to support hypotheses of Magdalenian hunter-gatherer seasonal ranges, and perhaps trade routes.

In northern Spain and south-west France this tool culture was superseded by the Azilian culture. In northern Europe it was followed by variants of the Tjongerian techno-complex. It has been suggested that key Late-glacial sites in south-western Britain may be attributed to Magdalenian culture, including Kent's Cavern.

Art 

Bones, reindeer antlers and animal teeth display crude pictures carved or etched on them of seals, fish, reindeer, mammoths and other creatures.

The best of Magdalenian artworks are a mammoth engraved on a fragment of its own ivory; a dagger of reindeer antler, with a handle in form of a reindeer; a cave-bear cut on a flat piece of schist; a seal on a bear's tooth; a fish drawn on a reindeer antler; and a complete picture, also on reindeer antler, showing horses, an aurochs, trees, and a snake biting a man's leg. The man is naked, which, together with the snake, suggests a warm climate in spite of the presence of the reindeer.

In the Tuc d'Audoubert cave, an 18-inch clay statue of two bison sculpted in relief was discovered in the deepest room, now known as the Room of the Bisons.

Examples of Magdalenian portable art include batons, figurines, and intricately engraved projectile points, as well as items of personal adornment including sea shells, perforated carnivore teeth (presumably necklaces), and fossils.

Cave sites such as Lascaux contain the best known examples of Magdalenian cave art. The site of Altamira in Spain, with its extensive and varied forms of Magdalenian mobiliary art has been suggested to be an agglomeration site where groups of Magdalenian hunter-gatherers congregated.

Gallery

Treatment of the dead
Some skulls were cleaned of soft tissues, then had the facial regions removed, with the remaining brain case retouched, possibly to make the broken edges more regular. This manipulation suggests the shaping of skulls to produce skull cups.

Genetics
The genes of seven Magdalenians, the El Miron Cluster in Iberia, have shown close relationship to a population who had lived in Northern Europe some 20,000 years previously. The analyses suggested that 70-80% of the ancestry of these individuals was from the population represented by Goyet Q116-1, associated with the Aurignacian culture of about 35,000 BP, from the Goyet Caves in modern Belgium.

The three samples of Y-DNA included two samples of haplogroup I and one sample of HIJK. All samples of mtDNA belonged to U, including five samples of U8b and one sample of U5b.

See also

Magdalenian Girl
Swimming Reindeer
Art of the Upper Paleolithic
List of Stone Age art
Haplogroup I (Y-DNA)
Pre-Celtic

References

Notes

Footnotes

Bibliography

External links

Picture Gallery of the Paleolithic (reconstructional palaeoethnology), Libor Balák at the Czech Academy of Sciences, the Institute of Archaeology in Brno, The Center for Paleolithic and Paleoethnological Research

 
Industries (archaeology)
Upper Paleolithic cultures of Europe
Archaeological cultures in Belgium
Archaeological cultures in the Czech Republic
Archaeological cultures in France
Archaeological cultures in Germany
Archaeological cultures in Portugal
Archaeological cultures in Spain